Dendrorhynchus is a gregarine genus with total 2 species. The genus was first described in 1920 by David Keilin from the alimentary canal of dolichopodid larvae Systenus.

Homonyms 
Dendrorhynchus is a senior homonym for genera of nemerteans (replaced with Polydendrorhynchus) and pterosaurians (replaced with Dendrorhynchoides).

References 

Apicomplexa genera